Anchor Dam is a dam in Hot Springs County, about  west of Thermopolis, Wyoming.

The concrete thin-arch dam was completed in 1960 by the United States Bureau of Reclamation as a water storage project.  The -high dam structure impounds the water of the South Fork of Owl Creek, with the spillway as designed as a central overflow "notch".

Unfortunately the reservoir never filled. During construction, the discovery of solution cavities in the bedrock forced the re-positioning and re-configuration of the dam, causing delays and added expense. It has never been full. More than 50 sinkholes had been identified in the underlying Chugwater Formation geology of the reservoir basin, with at least one of them 30 feet in diameter and 35 feet deep. The site's lack of "hydraulic integrity" was well known to Bureau scientists before and during construction.

The reservoir fills enough to provide some irrigation benefit through July and August of each season.  It is operated by the local Owl Creek Irrigation District.

References 

Buildings and structures in Hot Springs County, Wyoming
Dams in Wyoming
Reservoirs in Wyoming
United States Bureau of Reclamation dams
Arch dams
Dams completed in 1960
1960 establishments in Wyoming
Landforms of Hot Springs County, Wyoming